Wim van der Veen from the Netherlands, is a Tenpin bowler. He finished in 24th position at the 2006 AMF World Cup and played in the 2006 World Tenpin Masters.

Van der Veen is not related to Auke van der Veen, a Dutch TV host.

References

Living people
Year of birth missing (living people)
Dutch ten-pin bowling players
Sportspeople from Emmen, Netherlands